The 1923 All-Western college football team consists of American football players selected to the All-Western teams chosen by various selectors for the 1923 college football season.

All-Western selections

Ends
 Ray Eklund, Minnesota (WE-1)
 LaVern Dilweg, Marquette (WE-1)
 Frank Rokusek, Illinois (WE-2)
 Lowell Otte, Iowa (WE-2)
 Russell Irish, Wisconsin (WE-3)
 Evar Swanson, Lombard (WE-3)

Tackles
 Marty Below, Wisconsin (WE-1) (CFHOF)
 Stanley Muirhead, Michigan (WE-1)
 Jerome Kriz, Iowa (WE-2)
 Boni Petcoff, Ohio State (WE-2)
 Eugene Oberst, Notre Dame (WE-3)
 Gowdy, Chicago (WE-3)

Guards
 Jim McMillen, Illinois (WE-1)
 Lloyd Rohrke, Chicago (WE-1)
 Eldon Haley, Kansas (WE-2)
 Adolph Bieberstein, Wisconsin (WE-2)
 Gay, Minnesota (WE-3)
 Harvey Brown, Notre Dame (WE-3)

Centers
 Jack Blott, Michigan (WE-1)
 Ralph Claypool, Purdue (WE-2)
 John Lonborg, Kansas (WE-3)

Quarterbacks
 Hoge Workman, Ohio State (WE-1)
 Red Dunn, Marquette (WE-2)
 Harry Stuhldreher, Notre Dame (WE-3) (CFHOF)

Halfbacks
 Red Grange, Illinois (WE-1) (CFHOF/PFHOF)
 Don Miller, Notre Dame (WE-1) (CFHOF)
 Dave Noble, Nebraska (WE-2)
 Harry Kipke, Michigan (WE-2) (CFHOF)
 Earl Martineau, Minnesota (WE-3)
 Bill Boelter, Drake (WE-3)

Fullbacks
 John Levi, Haskell (WE-1)
 Elmer Layden, Notre Dame (WE-2) (CFHOF)
 Merrill Taft, Wisconsin (WE-3)

Key
WE = Walter Eckersall in the Chicago Tribune

CFHOF = College Football Hall of Fame

PFHOF = Pro Football Hall of Fame

See also
1923 College Football All-America Team

References

1923 Big Ten Conference football season
All-Western college football teams